Qaleh-ye Seyyed (also Romanized as Qal‘eh-ye Seyyed, Ghal‘eh Seyyed, and Qal‘eh Saiyid) is a village in Shamsabad Rural District, in the Central District of Dezful County, Khuzestan Province, Iran. At the 2006 census, its population was 4,091, in 913 families.

References 

Populated places in Dezful County